Serbo-Croatian or Croato-Serbian, rarely Serbo-Croat or Croato-Serb, refers to a South Slavic language that is the primary language of Serbia, Croatia, Bosnia and Herzegovina, and Montenegro.

Serbo-Croatian, Serbo-Croat, Croato-Serbian, Croato-Serb, Serbian–Croatian, or Croatian–Serbian may also refer to any shared aspects of Serbia and Croatia, or the entire region in which the Serbo-Croatian language is spoken:
 Serbo-Croatian kinship, the system of family relationships among the people who speak Serbo-Croatian standard languages
 Croatian-Serbian relations – diplomatic, economic, and other relationships between Croatia and Serbia
 Serbo-Croatian War, 1991–1995, also known as the Croatian War of Independence
 Serbo-Croatian dialects
 Serbo-Croatian grammar
 Serbo-Croatian phonology
 Serbo-Croatian language secessionism
 Serbo-Croatian Cyrillic, a name for the Serbian Cyrillic alphabet, though not typically used in Croatia
 Serbo-Croatian Latin, a name for Gaj's Latin alphabet

See also
 South Slavic dialect continuum, which includes the Serbo-Croatian language
 Shtokavian dialect of the Serbo-Croatian language
 Serbian (disambiguation)
 Croatian (disambiguation)